Arotrephes is a genus of parasitoid wasps belonging to the family Ichneumonidae.

The species of this genus are found in Europe.

Species:
 Arotrephes brevicauda Horstmann, 1995 
 Arotrephes coriaceus Horstmann, 1995

References

Ichneumonidae
Hymenoptera genera